The 1966 Segunda División de Chile was the 15th season of the Segunda División de Chile.

Huachipato was the tournament's champion.

Table

See also
Chilean football league system

References

External links
 RSSSF 1966

Segunda División de Chile (1952–1995) seasons
Primera B
Chil